Golden Goose is an Italian high fashion sneaker brand based in Venice, Italy.

After belonging to The Carlyle Group for three years, it was sold to Permira in 2020. In 2022, Golden Goose purchased its main sneaker supplier, Italian Fashion Team.

References

External links
 

Clothing brands of Italy
Shoe companies of Italy
Shoe brands
Clothing companies established in 2000
2000 establishments in Italy
2017 mergers and acquisitions
2020 mergers and acquisitions